Stranger on My Land is a 1988 Western television film, premiered on American Broadcasting Company, directed by Larry Elikann and is also Joseph Gordon-Levitt's debut role.

Plot
Bud Witman takes part in the forced removal of villagers in Vietnam by detonating their homes that are on land that is declared unsafe because of the war. He is injured while in combat. After surgery he is sent home and returns to Chinook Ranch, a cattle ranch. Some years later the government starts proceedings for a proposed Air Force base extension in the area. Connie Priest, county surveyor, shows animosity toward the Witmans.

Some families have accepted the government's offers for their land, but the Witmans file suit in court to fight the sale. The court rules to enforce eminent domain and the government starts to prepare for the project, although the Witmans will not leave. If the land is not vacated before the ground freezes, the project will be delayed. There is a confrontation with Priest who shoots Vern Whitman. He dies and is interred on the ranch.

Bud's combat buddy shows up to help in his plight. The government intends to use deputized locals when they show up in force with a moving van to remove Bud. The public road leading to the ranch is crowded with spectators. Explosives are detonated by Bud when the first unsuccessful assault is made on the property. Priest volunteers to remove Bud from the property on his own terms that have not been disclosed to the operation's commanding military officer on site. Priest and his cohorts riddle the house with bullets and will not cease when commanded by the U.S. Marshall.

Bud and his small force exit the house before it is set ablaze. They take new positions and disable the Priest force except for Priest. Bud lures Priest into the wilds. Bud is shot but not incapacitated. Fisticuffs are used to disable Priest and Bud attempts to drown him; an appeal by Annie Witman makes Bud relent. Priest retrieves from the stream his gun and is about to fire on Bud when the Marshall shoots and kills Priest.

When Bud returns to the ranch the spectators flock to greet him. The judge that confirmed the order of eminent domain arrives at the ranch and notifies the commanding officer on site to back down as he intends to review the order the following day.

Cast
 Tommy Lee Jones as Bud Whitman (Vern's son)
Jeff Allin as Marine Captain
 Richard Anderson as Maj. Walters
 Michael Paul Chan as Eliot (Bud's combat buddy)
 Joseph Gordon-Levitt as Rounder Whitman (Bud's son)
 Dee Wallace as Annie Whitman (Bud's wife)
 Barry Corbin as Gil (US Marshall)
 Terry O'Quinn as Connie Priest (County Surveyor)
 Pat Hingle as Judge Munson (Whitman family attorney)
 Michael Flynn as Brewer 
 Ben Johnson as Vern Whitman (Bud's father)

Production
Parts of the film were shot in Salt Lake City and Kamas, Utah.

References 

1988 television films
American Western (genre) television films
ABC network original films
Films produced by Michael Barnathan
Films directed by Larry Elikann
1980s English-language films
1988 Western (genre) films